Murrin Murrin is an abandoned town in Western Australia located  east of Perth, situated along the Old Laverton Road in between Leonora and Laverton in the Goldfields-Esperance region of Western Australia.

The town began as a mining camp, as part of a gold rush, with allotments being made available in 1896. Alfred Edward Morgans, who later became Premier of Western Australia, established a short-lived copper smelter in the area in 1896. The boundaries of the town were extended in 1906 to the include the railway station. All further development occurred alongside the railway line. A police station was opened in 1905, with building constructed in 1906 and then closed in 1911. The station was then reopened in 1943 and then closed again in 1951.

Murrin is an Indigenous Australian name for a species of Acacia tree that is commonly found in the area.

Nickel was discovered in Kambalda and the nearby Mount Windarra in the 1960s.

References 

Shire of Leonora
Ghost towns in Western Australia